Alma Vītola (born 1992) is a Latvian ultra marathon runner.

References

External links

1992 births
Living people
Latvian female marathon runners
Place of birth missing (living people)